Michal Švihálek (born April 29, 1993) is a Czech professional ice hockey player. He is currently playing for MsHK Zilina of the Slovak Extraliga.

Švihálek made his Czech Extraliga debut playing with Motor České Budějovice during the 2011-12 Czech Extraliga season.

References

External links

1993 births
Living people
Motor České Budějovice players
Stadion Hradec Králové players
MsHK Žilina players
Czech ice hockey forwards
People from Jindřichův Hradec
Sportspeople from the South Bohemian Region
Czech expatriate ice hockey players in Slovakia